André LeBlanc is a fictional character appearing in American comic books published by DC Comics. As his name implies ("André LeBlanc" translated from French into English is "Andre The White"), LeBlanc is easily identified by his highly-conspicuous white outfit.

Publication history
André LeBlanc first appeared in Teen Titans #18 and was created by Marv Wolfman and Len Wein.

Fictional character biography
The self-styled "world's greatest jewel thief", arrogant André LeBlanc made the international most wanted list. He often clashed with the Russian superhero Leonid Kovar (also known as Starfire and later as Red Star). André LeBlanc delighted in evading capture by the young hero. Interpol requested that the Teen Titans team up with Kovar to safeguard the Crown Jewels of Sweden from André LeBlanc. So confident in his abilities, the bragging thief announced his crimes before they were committed. Mutual antagonism spoiled the joint efforts of the American and Soviet champions, until Kovar rescued the Titans from LeBlanc's deathtraps. Kid Flash then returned the favor by saving Kovar from death on the subway tracks, while Robin defeated LeBlanc in hand-to-hand combat.

In other media
 André LeBlanc appears in Teen Titans, voiced by Dee Bradley Baker. This version is a member of the Brotherhood of Evil.
 André LeBlanc appears in the Batman: The Brave and the Bold episode "Four Star Spectacular!".

References

External links
 André LeBlanc at DC Wiki
 André LeBlanc at Comic Vine

Characters created by Marv Wolfman
Characters created by Len Wein
Comics characters introduced in 1968
DC Comics supervillains
Fictional professional thieves